5F-PCN (also known as 5F-MN-21) is an azaindole-based synthetic cannabinoid that is presumed to be a potent agonist of the CB1 receptor and has been sold online as a designer drug. It is closely related to NNE1. Given the known metabolic liberation (and presence as an impurity) of amantadine in the related compound APINACA, it is suspected that metabolic hydrolysis of the amide group of 5F-PCN may release 1-naphthylamine, a known carcinogen.

Legal status

Sweden's public health agency suggested to classify 5F-PCN as hazardous substance on November 10, 2014.

See also 

 5F-NNE1
 AM-2201
 APICA
 CUMYL-PICA
 CUMYL-5F-P7AICA
 JWH-018
 NM-2201
 SDB-005

References 

Designer drugs
Naphthoylindoles
Indolecarboxamides
Pyrrolopyridines
Organofluorides